Juliana Neuhuber (born 1979) is a director, screenwriter, and artist from Austria. She is based in Vienna.

Neuhuber has been active in the Austrian independent film scene since 1998, and realized many short films and artistic projects.

Her first feature film is Je Suis Auto, written by Johannes Grenzfurthner. The film features Chase Masterson and Jason Scott.

Neuhuber won the Austrian Indie Adler (Honorary Award) at the Austrian Filmfestival 2018.

References

External links 

 Official homepage

Living people
1979 births
21st-century Austrian writers
21st-century Austrian women artists
21st-century screenwriters
Austrian contemporary artists
Austrian film directors
Austrian screenwriters
English-language film directors
Film people from Vienna
Austrian women writers
Feminist filmmakers
Feminist artists